Holub's golden weaver (Ploceus xanthops), also known as the African golden weaver, is a species of bird in the family Ploceidae. It is found from Gabon to Uganda and Kenya, south to northern Namibia, northern Botswana and eastern South Africa.

The common name commemorates the Czech naturalist  Emil Holub.

References

External links
 Holub's golden weaver -  Species text in Weaver Watch.
 Holub's golden weaver - Species text in The Atlas of Southern African Birds.

Holub's golden weaver
Birds of Sub-Saharan Africa
Holub's golden weaver
Birds of East Africa
Taxonomy articles created by Polbot